was a Japanese photographer.

References

Japanese photographers
1895 births
1972 deaths